Erigone aletris is a spider species found in the United States and Canada. It has been introduced to Britain and Italy.

References

Linyphiidae
Spiders of North America
Spiders described in 1928